Frank Colin Ovard (born 16 December 1955 in Evesham) is an English former professional footballer who played in the Football League, as a forward.

References

Sources
Profile at Neil Brown
Frank Ovard player profile Nuts and Bolts Archive: History of Ashford Town/United

1955 births
Living people
People from Evesham
English footballers
Association football forwards
Ashford United F.C. players
Maidstone United F.C. (1897) players
Gillingham F.C. players
Folkestone F.C. players
Dover Athletic F.C. players
Margate F.C. players
Crawley Town F.C. players
English Football League players
Hythe Town F.C. players
Sportspeople from Worcestershire